The Columbian Viceroyalty, Viceroyalty of India or First Viceroyalty in the Indies is the name that designates the number of titles and rights granted to Christopher Columbus by the Catholic Monarchs in 1492 on the lands discovered and undiscovered, before embarking on his first trip that culminated in the colonization of the Americas.

Origins 
The titles and powers over discovered lands granted to Christopher Columbus were entered in the capitulations of Santa Fe agreed on April 17 of 1492.
Under them, the Catholic Monarchs, Isabella and Ferdinand, awarded for the period of his life, and after his death, to be conferred on his heirs or Successors one after the other perpetually:
 The title of Admiral of the Ocean Sea over all the islands and the mainland that discovered or won in this sea.
 The titles, always referred to together, of "Viceroy and Governor General".
In addition, other powers and economic prerogatives.

These titles would be confirmed by the monarchs on his return from his first voyage in May 1493. Of these, the best known in Castile, which paid the most attention both Columbus and the monarchs, was the Admiral.

History 
According to the capitulations of Santa Fe, all lands discovered by Christopher Columbus were part of his viceroyalty:

In his first trip to the Americas (it got to Guanahani on 12 October 1492), Columbus discovered the Bahamas, Cuba and The Hispaniola, exerting his position as viceroy and governor in them, leaving to return to Spain to 39 men in La Navidad in Hispaniola, which was founded on December 25, 1492. the fort was destroyed shortly then by the Indians of the island, killing all its occupants.

On his second trip in 1493 Christopher Columbus discovered Guadalupe and other islands located on the side of Atlantic Ocean between it and Puerto Rico, where he arrived on 19 November 1493. Later he found Jamaica and explored Cuba. On his return to Spain in 1496 he discovered the Lesser Antilles located on the side of Caribbean Sea between Puerto Rico and Dominica.

On his third trip in 1498 he discovered Trinidad, Paria Peninsula and the Island of Margarita, remaining until 1500 in Hispaniola.

The kings sent to the Spanish as pesquisador judge (with government functions) to Francisco de Bobadilla in 1500, which upon arrival (August 23) arrested Columbus and his brothers and sailed Spain, dismissing him from the government. Columbus refused to be removed the shackles around his trip to Spain, during which he wrote a long letter to the Catholic Monarchs. Upon arriving to Spain he regained his freedom, but had lost prestige, its powers and the viceroyality.
Bobadilla was also relieved of his government and replaced by Nicolas de Ovando in 1502.

On his fourth trip, in 1502, he found St. Lucia and Martinique. He then toured the Central American coast from the Bay Islands to Gulf of Urabá. He remained in Jamaica until 1504 and then returned to Spain died on May 20, 1506 in Convent of San Francisco of Valladolid.

Since 1499 the kings authorized other trips of discovery without the authorization of Columbus, including those of Alonso de Ojeda and Vicente Yáñez Pinzón, creating for them governments in the territories they discovered: the governorate Coquibacoa on the coast of Venezuela, except Paria discovered by Columbus was for De Ojeda and Pinzón the governor off the coast of Brazil between the Amazon river and the Cape Holy Mary of Consolation. These governorates were exempted from the Viceroyalty of the Indies.

The Viceroyalty after the death of Columbus 
On Christopher Columbus's death his eldest son Diego Columbus inherited his father's rights in the Americas, including the viceroyalty. However, King Ferdinand refused at first to transfer all rights of his father and appointed him governor of Hispaniola in 1508. Diego began a series of lawsuits against the crown known as the Columbian Lawsuits, and in 1511 his rights as viceroy were recognized, but with limited jurisdiction over those territories that had been officially discovered by his father. Consequently, Diego Columbus became the second Viceroy of the Indies. He died in 1526 bequeathing his rights to the viceroyalty to his son Luis Colón.

During the minority of Luis Colón the transaction occurred and arbitration that ended Columbian Lawsuits with the Spanish crown and in 1537 he received the knighthood of this I Duke of Veragua and Manor territorial six hundred twenty-five square leagues, composed of lands of ancient Veragua and Castilla del Oro. He was also graced with the hereditary dignity of I Marquis of Jamaica and the lordship of the island, putting an end to the Viceroyalty of the Indies

References

Bibliography 
 
 
 

Spanish West Indies
Spanish colonization of the Americas
Viceroyalties of the Spanish Empire
Former colonies in North America
Former countries in the Caribbean
Christopher Columbus
Colonial Puerto Rico
Colony of Santiago
History of the Colony of Santo Domingo
History of Hispaniola
Spanish colonial period of Cuba
1490s in the Spanish West Indies
1500s in the Spanish West Indies
1510s in the Spanish West Indies
1520s in the Spanish West Indies
1530s in the Spanish West Indies
1492 establishments in North America
1535 disestablishments in North America
1530s disestablishments in New Spain
1492 establishments in the Spanish Empire
1535 disestablishments in the Spanish Empire
1492 establishments in the Spanish West Indies
1530s disestablishments in the Spanish West Indies
15th century in the Caribbean
16th century in the Caribbean